Tabernaemontana divaricata, commonly called pinwheel flower, crape jasmine, East India rosebay, and Nero's crown, is an evergreen shrub or small tree native to South Asia, Southeast Asia and China. In zones where it is not hardy it is grown as a house/glasshouse plant for its attractive flowers and foliage. The stem exudes a milky latex when broken, whence the name milk flower.

Description
The waxy blossoms are found in small clusters on the stem tips. The (single) flowers have the characteristic 'pinwheel' shape also seen in other genera in the family Apocynaceae such as Vinca and Nerium. Both single and double-flowered forms are cultivated, the flowers of both forms being white. The plant blooms in spring but flowers appear sporadically all year. The flowers have a pleasing fragrance. More than 66 alkaloids are found in the shrub. Its habitats include montane brushwoods and sparse forests.

Phytochemistry 
The species is known to produce many alkaloids including catharanthine, coronaridine, dregamine, ibogamine, tabersonine, voacangine, voacamine and voacristine. Ibogaine may occur in multiple Tabernaemontana species.

Research
There is presence of potent acetylcholinestearase inhibitors in stems and roots of this plant. 3'-R/S-hydroxyvoacamine isolated from a stem extracts act as a non-competitive inhibitor against AChE with an IC50 value of 7.00±1.99 μM. Bisindole alkaloid 19,20-dihydrotabernamine and 19,20-Dihydroervahanine A shows higher inhibitory activity on acetylcholinesterase compared with galanthamine.

See also 
Tabernaemontana sananho

References

External links
 
 

divaricata
Flora of the Indian subcontinent
Flora of Indo-China
Flora of China
Garden plants of Asia
House plants
Plants described in 1753
Taxa named by Carl Linnaeus
Plants used in Ayurveda